The Yamaha DS7 (or YDS7 in the UK) motorcycle was made from 1970 to 1972. It was a 250cc twin two-stroke that made nearly 30 hp @ 7,500 rpm. Top speed was 93 mph. 12v battery ignition. five-speed gearbox. 1/4 mile in 14.8 seconds.

The DS7 was the initial forerunner of the Yamaha RD series of motorcycles started in 1973.  The major difference between the 250 cc DS7 and 350 cc R5 of 1972 and the 1973 RD250 and RD350 was that the DS7 and R5 utilized piston-port induction, whereas the RDs were introduced with reed valve induction. The engine is a square bore and stroke at 54 × 54 mm with the normal for the era cast iron lined aluminum finned cylinders. Pistons used two rings as is normal for 2 cycle engines. A 5 speed, transmission with a left foot gear change without the need for linkage from the right as was usual in the early 70's. Carburation was 2 VM26 round slide carbs, unlike its larger companion, the YR5 which ran VM28 round slides. The 250 was "oil injected" into the intake port, meaning that although the 250 was a 2 stroke or (2 cycle engine) there was no need to premix the gas and oil. The gas tank only contained gas but the oil was injected from an oil tank beneath the seat. The DS7 had a TLS (twin leading shoe) front brake that worked exceptionally well and an SLS (single leading shoe) brake on the rear. 
This motorcycle was based on the racing Yamaha with an excellent frame and the suspension was good too. It handled better than most riders could ride it even though the suspension was comfortable, almost cushy but far from mushy.
The Yamaha YDS7 is a great bike that hits well above its weight class.

See also
List of Yamaha motorcycles

DS7
Motorcycles introduced in 1972
Two-stroke motorcycles